Clodoaldo Francisco Chagas Ferreira, better known as Clodoaldo (December 28, 1978 in Ipú), is a Brazilian who works in the attack for Guarani de Juazeiro.

Career

Leading scorer in Fortaleza, started the club in four opportunities, scoring 126 goals.
Several times on issues made by the reporter / columnist Victor Hanover for the program Globo Esporte da Rede Globo Television, Clodoaldo had his playing style, his music and his name quite widespread, making it the best known player Squads, acting by a club Ceara in Brazil. His music, rap's Clod, became a national craze in 2003.
Output had troubled the Fort, where even today divides opinion of fans and £20,000 should the club.
Thirteen was released by Campina Grande to escape the concentration appears in the stadium and Buddy drunk, just one hour of decision by the tournament against Campinense.

In 2002 almost died when he crashed his car outside of a club of forró in Fortaleza.

In 2004 playing for Ituano was arrested at the end of the game, still in the field for not paying alimony, in a match against Ceara in the stadium Presidente Vargas.

It is considered one of the revelations of Ceará football in recent years. Born in Ipu, state of Ceará. Was in 2010 hired by Ceará.

In May 2011, he didn't extend contract with Ceará and became a free agent.

References

External links

1978 births
Living people
Association football forwards
Brazilian footballers
Ceará Sporting Club players
Horizonte Futebol Clube players